Ibrahim Müteferrika (1674–1745 CE) was a Hungarian-born Ottoman diplomat, publisher, economist, historian, Islamic theologian, sociologist, and the first Muslim to run a printing press with movable Arabic type.

Early life
Ibrahim Muteferrika was born in Kolozsvár (present-day Cluj-Napoca, Romania). He was an ethnic Hungarian Unitarian who converted to Islam, but his original Hungarian name is unknown.

Diplomatic service
At a young age, Ibrahim Muteferrika entered the Ottoman diplomatic services. He took an active part in the negotiations with Austria and Russia. Ibrahim Muteferrika was an active figure in promoting the Ottoman-French alliance (1737–1739) against Austria and Russia. Ibrahim Muteferrika was also acclaimed for his role in the Ottoman-Swedish action against Russia.

During his services as a diplomat, he is known to have befriended many influential personalities including Osman Aga of Temesvar, a fellow diplomat of Transylvanian origins and former prisoner-of-war imprisoned in Austria.

It was during his years as a diplomat that he took a keen interest in collecting books that helped him understand the ongoing Renaissance, the emergence of Protestant movements in Europe, and the rise of powerful colonial empires in Europe.

Printing press

The printing press had already been known in the Ottoman Empire since 1493 or 1504 in Hebrew characters. Other communities operated presses. The first Ottoman press using movable Arabic type was operated in 1706–1711 in Aleppo by Christians.

Muteferrika's volumes, printed in Istanbul and using custom-made fonts, are occasionally referred to as "Turkish incunabula".

Following a 1726 report on the efficiency of the new system, which he drafted and presented simultaneously to Grand Vizier Nevşehirli Damat İbrahim Pasha, the Grand Mufti, and the clergy, and a later request submitted to Sultan Ahmed III, he received permission to publish non-religious books (despite opposition from some Islamic calligraphers and religious leaders). Muteferrika's press published its first book in 1729, and, by 1743, issued 17 works in 23 volumes (each having between 500 and 1,000 copies). The first book ever published by Muteferrika is "Vankulu Lügati", a 2-volume Arabic-Turkish dictionary. Printing religious books was prohibited until 1803.

Among the works published by Müteferrika were historical and generically scientific works, as well as Katip Çelebi's world atlas Cihannüma (loosely translated as The Mirror of the World or the World Seer). In a digression that he added to his printing, Müteferrika discussed the heliocentrism of astronomy in detail, with references to relatively up-to-date scientific arguments for and against it. In that regard, he is considered one of the first people to properly introduce heliocentrism to Ottoman readers.

After 1742, however, Ibrahim Muteferrika's printing activities were discontinued and an attempt by the British diplomat James Mario Matra, motivated by the exorbitant prices for manuscript books, to re-establish a press in Istanbul was aborted in 1779. In his account, Matra refers to the strong opposition of the scribes that Müteferrika's enterprise had faced:

Legacy
A statue of Muteferrika can be found in the Sahaflar Çarşısı adjacent to the Grand Bazaar in Istanbul.

Books published 
There were 17 titles published by Muteferrika at his press during his lifetime:

 Kitab-ı Lügat-ı Vankulu (Sihah El-Cevheri), 2 volumes, 1729
 Tuhfet-ül Kibar fi Esfar el-Bihar, 1729
 Tarih-i Seyyah, 1729
 Tarih-i Hind-i Garbi, 1730
 Tarih-i Timur Gürgan, 1730
 Tarih-I Mısr-i Kadim ve Mısr-i Cedid, 1730
 Gülşen-i Hülefa, 1730
 Grammaire Turque, 1730
 Usul el-Hikem fi Nizam el-Ümem, 1732
 Fiyuzat-ı Mıknatısiye, 1732
 Cihan-nüma, 1732
 Takvim el-Tevarih, 1733
 Kitab-ı Tarih-i Naima, 2 volumes, 1734
 Tarih-i Raşid, 3 volumes, 1735
 Tarih-i Çelebizade, 1741
 Ahval-i Gazavat der Diyar-ı Bosna, 1741
 Kitab-ı Lisan el-Acem el Müsemma bi-Ferheng-i Şuuri,  2 volumes, 1742

(Most of the copies of the book Tarih-i Çelebizade  have been bound into the third and last volume of Tarih-i Raşid and sold together with it and thus have erroneously led several sources to believe a total of 16 items have been published.)

Own works 

 Risâle Islâmiyye (available in manuscript form) (published by [Esed Cosan] in 1993)

See also
 Great Divergence
 Printing

References

Sources

External links

Image of Ibrahim Muteferrika

1674 births
1745 deaths
Diplomats from Cluj-Napoca
18th-century Hungarian historians
18th-century historians from the Ottoman Empire
Political people from the Ottoman Empire
Hungarian Muslims
Hungarian former Christians
Converts to Islam from Protestantism
Printers
Scientists from the Ottoman Empire